Leo Tarcissus McCarthy (August 15, 1930 – February 5, 2007) was an American politician and businessman. He served as the 43rd Lieutenant Governor of California from 1983 to 1995.

Early life and education
McCarthy, whose parents were both natives of Tralee, Ireland, was himself born in Auckland, New Zealand, but emigrated to the United States with his parents Daniel and Nora McCarthy, and siblings when he was three years old. The McCarthy family sailed from the Port of Wellington, New Zealand on the Union Steam Ship Makura, which arrived at the Port of San Francisco, California, on February 9, 1934. He went to elementary school at Mission Dolores. He then went to high school at St. Ignatius College Preparatory. He earned a Bachelor of Arts degree in history from the University of San Francisco and a law degree from San Francisco Law School, now integrated to Alliant International University.

Career
McCarthy joined the United States Air Force in March 1951, and served for twenty-one months until the end of 1952, as an enlisted man. He was in an intelligence unit at the Strategic Air Command and was stationed at Lake Charles, Louisiana for seventeen months. While at the Strategic Air Command, he spent a few weeks deployed to Saudi Arabia taking part in a mission to simulate the start of World War III. He also served in the United States Air Force Reserves for a few years.

California Assembly
In 1958, the year that saw the Democrats capture statewide offices for the first time since World War II, McCarthy managed the successful campaign for State Senate of J. Eugene McAteer. After the election, McCarthy served as McAteer's administrative assistant.

McCarthy first ran for office in 1963, when he was elected to the San Francisco Board of Supervisors. He served there until 1967. In 1968, he was elected to the State Assembly, serving as speaker of the Assembly from 1974 to 1980. (Art Agnos, elected mayor of San Francisco in 1988, had his political start as McCarthy's first legislative assistant, and later as the speaker's chief of staff.) As speaker, McCarthy earned a reputation as a partisan, take-no-prisoners insider in Democratic Party politics.

McCarthy unexpectedly lost the speakership to Willie Brown in 1980. McCarthy had been facing a stiff challenge from Howard Berman. Seeing his fellow Democrats so divided, Brown worked with Republicans to gain the speakership. Both of the losers in this struggle soon left the legislature. Berman ran for Congress and McCarthy ran for statewide office.

Lieutenant governor of California
McCarthy was first elected to statewide office to the first of three consecutive four-year terms as lieutenant governor of California in 1982, at the same time that Republican George Deukmejian was elected governor. In 1986, the incumbent McCarthy ran against Republican Mike Curb, a former film producer and music promoter with a reputation for opposing drug use by artists. In a hotly-contested race for lieutenant governor that centered largely around violent crime and drug policy, McCarthy alleged that Curb made a fortune in making 'exploitation films' that glorified drugs, sex, and violence. Curb was so incensed at the charges that he filed a $7-million libel and slander suit against McCarthy, who ultimately won the election.

After his failed 1988 Senate campaign, McCarthy won a third term as lieutenant governor in 1990, while his 1988 opponent Pete Wilson won the election for governor.

1988 U.S. Senate campaign 

In 1988, McCarthy ran for the U.S. Senate. He easily won the Democratic Party nomination but was defeated in the general election by the Republican incumbent and future Governor Pete Wilson. As of 2021, this was the last time a Republican won a U.S. Senate seat in California. McCarthy's 4,287,253 votes set a record for the most votes given to a losing Democratic Senate candidate that lasted until it was broken by MJ Hegar of Texas in 2020. McCarthy was the first person ever to get 4 million votes in a losing Senate campaign.

1992 U.S. Senate campaign 
In 1992, McCarthy entered the Democratic primary election for the U.S. Senate but lost the nomination to US Representative (and later general election winner) Barbara Boxer.

McCarthy retired from public office at the end of his third term as lieutenant governor on January 2, 1995, having been prohibited from seeking re-election to a fourth term in office because of state term limits. He was succeeded by fellow Democratic then-State Controller and future Governor Gray Davis. McCarthy's 12 years are the longest any California lieutenant governor has served. Upon leaving politics, he created an investment company, The Daniel Group, named for his father and located in San Francisco.

Leo T. McCarthy Center
He helped found the Leo T. McCarthy Center for Public Service and the Common Good at the University of San Francisco.

Personal life
McCarthy was married on December 17, 1955, to the former Jacqueline Lee Burke. They had four children (Sharon, Conna, Adam, and Niall) and eleven grandchildren.

After a long illness, McCarthy died from a kidney ailment at his home in San Francisco on February 5, 2007.

Sources
Online archive of California
Leo T. McCarthy: 1930–2007
Candidate Bio
Leo T. McCarthy, Oral History Interview, California State Archives, 1995–1996
New Zealand Immigration Archives

References

External links
McCarthy Center at the University of San Francisco

 

 

1930 births
2007 deaths
American Roman Catholics
Burials at Holy Cross Cemetery (Colma, California)
Deaths from kidney failure
American people of Irish descent
New Zealand emigrants to the United States
Lieutenant Governors of California
San Francisco Board of Supervisors members
San Francisco Law School alumni
Speakers of the California State Assembly
Democratic Party members of the California State Assembly
University of San Francisco alumni
People from Auckland
Businesspeople from San Francisco
Lawyers from San Francisco
20th-century American politicians
United States Air Force airmen
United States Air Force reservists
20th-century American businesspeople
20th-century American lawyers